The following list is a discography of production by Ye, better known as Kanye West, an American rapper and record producer. It includes all of his work, as well as some of the music he produced and co-produced. The music is listed in sequential order by release date.

Singles
1999 
 Trina & Tamara - Joanne
 "It's Bigger Than Hip-Hop" (featuring Tahir and People's Army)" (Dead Prez)

2000
 "The Truth" (Beanie Sigel)

2001
 "Izzo (H.O.V.A.)" (Jay-Z)

2002
 "Guess Who's Back" (Scarface)
 "'03 Bonnie and Clyde" (Jay-Z featuring Beyoncé)
 "Get By" (Talib Kweli)
 "B R Right" (Trina featuring Ludacris)

2003
 "Stand Up" (Ludacris featuring Shawnna)
 "Knock Knock" (Monica)
 "Through the Wire" (Kanye West)
 "You Don't Know My Name" (Alicia Keys)
 "Encore" (Jay-Z)
 "Slow Jamz" (Kanye West featuring Twista & Jamie Foxx)

2004
 "All Falls Down" (Kanye West)
 "I Want You" (Janet Jackson)
 "Overnight Celebrity" (Twista featuring Kanye West)
 "Talk About Our Love" (Brandy featuring Kanye West)
 "Jesus Walks" (Kanye West)
 "Selfish" (Slum Village featuring Kanye West & John Legend)
 "The New Workout Plan" (Kanye West)
 "This Way" (Dilated Peoples featuring Kanye West)
 "Used to Love U" (John Legend)
 "I Try" (Talib Kweli featuring Mary J. Blige)
 "I Changed My Mind" (Keyshia Cole)
 "Throw Your Hands in the Air" (Mobb Deep)

2005
 "Brand New (Rhymefest featuring Kanye West)
 "The Corner" (Common)
 "Diamonds from Sierra Leone" (Kanye West)
 "Go" (Common featuring Kanye West)
 "Dreams" (The Game)
 "Gold Digger" (Kanye West featuring Jamie Foxx)
 "Testify" (Common)
 "Heard 'Em Say" (Kanye West featuring Adam Levine)

2006
 "Drive Slow" (Paul Wall featuring Kanye West & GLC)
 "Grammy Family" (DJ Khaled featuring Consequence, Kanye West, & John Legend)
 "Heaven" (John Legend)

2007
 "Wouldn't Get Far" (The Game featuring Kanye West)
 "The Game" (Common)
 "The People" (Common)
 "Can't Tell Me Nothing" (Kanye West)
 "Stronger" (Kanye West)
 "Good Life" (Kanye West featuring T-Pain)
 "Drivin' Me Wild" (Common featuring Lily Allen)
 "Flashing Lights" (Kanye West featuring Dwele)

2008
 "Homecoming" (Kanye West featuring Chris Martin)
 "Swagga Like Us" (T.I. & Jay-Z featuring Kanye West & Lil Wayne)
 "Love Lockdown" (Kanye West)
 "Heartless" (Kanye West)
 "Brooklyn Go Hard" (Jay-Z featuring Santigold)

2009
 "Amazing" (Kanye West featuring Young Jeezy)
 "Paranoid" (Kanye West featuring Mr Hudson)
 "Make Her Say" (Kid Cudi featuring Kanye West & Common)
 "Run This Town" (Jay-Z featuring Rihanna & Kanye West)

2010
 "Young Forever" (Jay-Z featuring Mr. Hudson)
 "A Star Is Born" (Jay-Z featuring J. Cole)
 "Find Your Love" (Drake)
 "Fuck the Industry" (Solange)
 "Ayyy Girl" (JYJ featuring Kanye West and Malik Yusef)
 "Power" (Kanye West)
 "Runaway" (Kanye West featuring Pusha T)
 "Monster"  (Kanye West featuring Jay-Z, Rick Ross, Nicki Minaj & Bon Iver)

2011
 "All of the Lights" (Kanye West featuring Rihanna)
 "Party" (Beyoncé featuring Andre 3000 or J. Cole)
 "Otis" (Jay-Z and Kanye West featuring Otis Redding)
 "Lift Off" (Jay-Z and Kanye West featuring Beyoncé)
 "Niggas in Paris"  (Jay-Z and Kanye West))
 "Gotta Have It" (Jay-Z and Kanye West))

2012
 "New God Flow" (Kanye West, Pusha T)
 "Birthday Song" (2 Chainz featuring Kanye West)
 "Clique" (Kanye West, Big Sean, Jay-Z)
 "Pain" (Pusha T featuring Future)

2013
 "Millions" (Pusha T featuring Rick Ross)
 "Who Do We Think We Are" (John Legend featuring Rick Ross)
 "Numbers on the Boards" (Pusha T)
 "Made to Love" (John Legend)
 "Black Skinhead" (Kanye West)
 "Bound 2" (Kanye West)
 "Sweet Serenade" (Pusha T featuring Chris Brown) 

2014
 "Nosetalgia" (Pusha T featuring Kendrick Lamar)
 "40 Mill" (Tyga)
 "I Don't Fuck with You" (Big Sean featuring E-40) 
 "Lunch Money" (Pusha T)
 "Only One" (Kanye West featuring Paul McCartney)

2015
 "FourFiveSeconds" (Rihanna, Kanye West & Paul McCartney)
 "All Day" (Kanye West featuring Theophilus London, Allan Kingdom & Paul McCartney)
 "Bitch Better Have My Money" (Rihanna)
 "American Oxygen" (Rihanna)
 "U Mad" (Vic Mensa featuring Kanye West)

2016
 "Famous" (Kanye West)
 "Father Stretch My Hands" (Kanye West)
 "Champions" (Kanye West, Gucci Mane, Big Sean, 2 Chainz, Travis Scott, Yo Gotti, Quavo & Desiigner)
 "Fade" (Kanye West)

2017
 "Glow" (Drake featuring Kanye West)

2018
 "Accelerate" (Christina Aguilera featuring Ty Dolla Sign and 2 Chainz) 
 "Ye vs. the People" (Kanye West featuring T.I.)
 "Lift Yourself" (Kanye West)
 "If You Know You Know" (Pusha T)
 "The Games We Play" (Pusha T)
 "What Would Meek Do?" (Pusha T featuring Kanye West)
 "Yikes" (Kanye West)
 "All Mine" (Kanye West)
 "Gonna Love Me" (Teyana Taylor)
 "Cops Shot the Kid" (Nas featuring Kanye West)
 "XTCY" (Kanye West)

2019
 "Issues/Hold On" (Teyana Taylor)
 "Sociopath" (Pusha T featuring Kash Doll)
 "Coming Home" (Pusha T featuring Ms. Lauryn Hill)
 "Take Me to the Light" (Francis and the Lights featuring Bon Iver and Kanye West)
 "Follow God" (Kanye West)
 "Closed on Sunday" (Kanye West)

2020
 "We Got Love" (Teyana Taylor featuring Ms. Lauryn Hill)
 "Made It" (Teyana Taylor)
 "Wash Us in the Blood" (Kanye West featuring Travis Scott)

2021
 "Industry Baby" (Lil Nas X featuring Jack Harlow)
 "A Wise Tale"  (Abstract Mindstate)
"Hurricane" (Kanye West and The Weeknd featuring Lil Baby)
"Life of the Party" (Kanye West featuring Andre 3000)
"Believe What I Say" (Kanye West)
"Off the Grid" (Kanye West featuring Playboi Carti and Fivio Foreign)

2022
 "Eazy" (The Game featuring Kanye West)
 "Diet Coke" (Pusha T)
 "City of Gods" (Fivio Foreign featuring Kanye West and Alicia Keys)
 "Daylight" (Vory featuring Kanye West)

Albums

References 

2. 

3. 

4.

External links 
 Discography with reviews
 Discogs entry
 AllHipHop discography

Production discographies
Hip hop discographies
Discographies of American artists